George Rickards may refer to:
George Rickards (footballer) (1884–1948), Australian rules footballer
Sir George Kettilby Rickards (1812–1889), political economist
George Rickards (politician) (1877–1943), British politician
George C. Rickards (1860–1933), Army National Guard general